Dice games are games that use or incorporate one or more dice as their sole or central component, usually as a random device.

The following are games which largely, if not entirely, depend on dice:

Collectible dice games
Patterned after the success of collectible card games, a number of collectible dice games have been published. Although most of these collectible dice games are long out-of-print, there is still a small following for many of them.

Some collectible dice games include:
Battle Dice 
Dice Masters
Diceland 
Dragon Dice

See also

Card game

References

 
Dice